Phalaenophana extremalis is a moth of the family Erebidae first described by William Barnes and James Halliday McDunnough in 1912. It is found in the US states of Arizona and New Mexico.

External links
Description of the larva of Phalaenophana extremalis with notes on P. pyramusalis (Noctuidae)

Herminiinae
Moths described in 1912